Lionel Brown (born September 17, 1987) is a professional soccer player who plays as a goalkeeper. Born in Jamaica, he plays for the US Virgin Islands internationally.

Career
Born in Kingston, Jamaica, Brown made his professional debut for the Fort Lauderdale Strikers on June 29, 2013 against the San Antonio Scorpions in which he started in goal as Fort Lauderdale lost the match 4–1.

After serving as Miami FC's backup keeping since 2016, Brown made his first Miami FC appearance on April 15, 2018. He came on as a field player in the 88th minute, relieving defender Rhett Bernstein.

International
He made his debut for the United States Virgin Islands national soccer team on March 22, 2019 in a CONCACAF Nations League qualifier against Anguilla, as a starter.

Coaching career

Since 2019, Brown has been the soccer coach at South Broward High School in Fort Lauderdale, Florida.

Career statistics

Club

International

Honors
Miami FC
National Premier Soccer League: 2018, 2019

References

External links
 Connecticut Huskies bio
 

1987 births
Living people
Sportspeople from Kingston, Jamaica
People from Miramar, Florida
Soccer players from Florida
American soccer players
United States Virgin Islands soccer players
United States Virgin Islands international soccer players
Jamaican footballers
Jamaican emigrants to the United States
Association football goalkeepers
UConn Huskies men's soccer players
University of Connecticut alumni
Fort Lauderdale Strikers players
Miami FC players
North American Soccer League players
Sportspeople from Broward County, Florida
High school soccer coaches in the United States
East Central Tigers athletes